Zakiya Dalila Harris is an American author known for her bestselling debut novel The Other Black Girl.

Early life and education 
Harris was born and raised in Connecticut. Her father, Frank Harris III, is a professor and former journalist for the Hartford Courant. Her sister is writer and NPR podcaster Aisha Harris.

Harris received her bachelor's degree from the University of North Carolina at Chapel Hill and her MFA in nonfiction creative writing from The New School.

Career 
Harris spent nearly three years at Knopf/Doubleday, first as an editorial assistant then as assistant editor, before leaving to write her debut novel The Other Black Girl. Her essays and book reviews have appeared in Guernica and The Rumpus.

The New York Times reported that Simon & Schuster's Atria imprint won the rights to The Other Black Girl in a nine-way auction for a six figure sum against fourteen publishers prior to its release. The Other Black Girl was released on June 1, 2021 and received positive critical reception from outlets such as the Washington Post and Kirkus Reviews. The Guardian described it as "a glimpse into the publishing world and its original take on black professional women striving to hold on to their authentic selves and their stresses."

A TV adaptation of this book is currently in development with Tara Duncan, Temple Hill Entertainment, and Hulu. Harris is co-writing the pilot with Rashida Jones.

Personal life 
Harris resides in Brooklyn, New York.

References

External links 

 Official website

American women novelists
African-American novelists
African-American women writers
The New School alumni
University of North Carolina at Chapel Hill alumni
Writers from Connecticut
21st-century African-American women
21st-century African-American people
Year of birth missing (living people)
Living people